The Battle of Bitlis refers to a series of engagements in the summer of 1916 for the town of Bitlis and to a lesser extent nearby Moush, between Russian Imperial forces and their Ottoman counterparts. The town was the last stronghold of the Ottoman Empire preventing the Russians from entering Anatolia and Mesopotamia.

The first military confrontation at Bitlis occurred in July 1915, when Russian troops launched an unsuccessful assault on the town's fortifications. The second confrontation began in February 1916 and ended with the capture of Bitlis by new Russian corps, which largely consisted of the 1st Battalion of the Armenian volunteer units under the command of Andranik Ozanian. The Allied withdrawal from Gallipoli gave opportunity for Turkish forces to redeploy to the Caucasus region. Russian commander Nikolai Yudenich intended to attack the Turks before they could organize their forces to launch an attack. After a series of clashes in Koprukoy, Erzurum, Moush, the Russian IV Caucasian Corps captured Bitlis on 2 March. 

The Ottoman troops of Ahmed Izzet Pasha were composed of veterans from the Gallipoli campaign. They were to outflank the Russians in Bitlis before the end of March, but communications were terrible, and troops had to march from Ankara for a month. The Turkish Second Army's (belated) offensive began on 2 August 1916 and successfully took back Bitlis (and Muş) but lost other territories in the Euphrates region to the Russians. On 24 August, the Russian forces had recaptured both Mush and Bitlis. The Ottomans suffered 34,000 casualties, around half of which were POWs.

References

The Berlin-Baghdad Express: the Ottoman Empire and Germany's bid for world power, Sean McMeekin, page 243

Conflicts in 1916
Battles of the Caucasus Campaign
Battles of World War I involving the Ottoman Empire
Battles of World War I involving Russia
Bitlis vilayet
1916 in Armenia
History of Bitlis
1916 in the Ottoman Empire
1916 in the Russian Empire